The  Brahmo Conference Organisation (Sammilan) was founded on 27 January 1881 at Mymensingh Bangladesh to maintain communication between Adi Dharm and  Sadharan Brahmo Samaj after the 2nd schism of Brahmoism in 1878. The stated objectives for founding the organisation included
to resolve the differences between the 2 existing Brahmic divisions of Adiism and Sadharanism,
preach from every platform that the Nabobidhan (a dissenting sect) is not the Brahmo religion but totally opposed to Brahmoism.

History
In 1878 the 2nd Brahmo schism ensues resulting in formation of the Sadharan Brahmo Samaj with the support of the Adi Brahmo Samaj. The remnant "New Dispensation" (Nabobidhan) sect creates confusion that they are also Brahmos and start a Samaj at Bhowanipore called Sammilan Samaj.

In 1879, the Adi Brahmo Samaj at Kolkatta deputed Hemendranath Tagore and Aghore Mukhopadhyaya to resolve theological differences with Sivanath Sastri and Ananda Mohan Bose of the other Samaj.

In 1880, a famous proclamation is issued by 8 prominent Brahmos of Sylhet at Comilla, calling inter alia for a common organisation to oppose the New Dispensation which "is totally opposed to Brahmoism".

"Let us all, every Brahmo and Brahmo Samaj, combine to let the world know that the New Dispensation is not the Brahmo religion: That we have not the least sympathy for the creed : That the New Dispensation is totally opposed to Brahmoism."

On 27 January 1881, the organisation was formed at Mymensingh. The first President was Hemendranath Tagore, the Secretary was Sivanath Sastri and the Treasurer was Raj Chandra Chaudhuri (son-in-law of Nobin Chandra Roy).

On 24 March 1881, the organisation was formally registered as a Society under the "Indian Societies Act, 1860" at Mymensingh.

After the untimely death of Hemendranath Tagore in 1884, differences again arose between the Adi Brahmos and Sadharan Brahmos in 1888. A furious row resulted in the Adi Brahmos legally shifting  the Society to Lahore in the Punjab where Nobin Chandra Roy was settled.

In 1890, an unofficial splinter conference was convened at Dhaka Bangladesh by Bhubanmohan Sen and Sasibhusan Datta, with the tacit support of Sadharan Samaj.

In 1891, a rival Brahmo Sammilan Organisation was formed in Bangladesh, with the support of the Bhowanipore Sammillan Samaj, by non-Brahmin factions of Sadharan Brahmo Samaj and Nabobidhan who had married inter-caste under Act III of 1872. The disagreements within the Sadharan Samaj over validity of caste in Brahmoism intensified and in 1907 the Brahmo Conference Organisation resolved that (for purpose of Census of India) "only such Brahmos who accept Trust principles of 1830 completely are entitled to the Brahmo name". Confronted with the results of the 1911 census, Sivanath Sastri was caused to dispute the census figures and retort in 1912 quoting Rev. S. Fletcher Williams  "There are more Brahmos outside the Brahmo Samaj than within it". Till 1916 no Brahmin was openly associated with this Sammilan, however, in this year Sivnath Sastri accepted an invitation to be President of the rival Sammilani conclave.

In 1942 during World War II elders of the Brahmo Conference accepted an invitation from Amar Chandra Bhattacharya to participate in the rival organisation's "unity" conclave at Dhamua (West Bengal), but they were assaulted there and the police had to be called in. Ever since that fateful day, the organisation has distrusted all peace efforts to unite the Brahmin and non-Brahmin factions within Sadharan Samaj.

In 1949 after the Partition of India, the organisation was shifted to Kanpur.

Beliefs
The Conference has certified 2 versions of the Fundamental Brahmo principles to be followed till such time as unity is achieved. These are also known as Brahmo Dharma Beej.

Anusthanic (Adi Brahmo) version
 There is only One "Supreme Spirit", Author and Preserver of Existence.
 There is no salvation and no way to achieve it.
 There is no scripture, revelation, creation, prophet, priest or teacher to be revered.
 There is no distinction.

Ananusthanic (Sadharan) version
 There is always Infinite Singularity - immanent and transcendent Singular Author and Preserver of Existence
 Being is created from Singularity. Being is renewed to Singularity. Being exists to be one (again) with Loving Singularity.
 Respect all creations and beings but never venerate them for only Singularity can be loved.
 Knowledge of pure Conscience is the One ruler of Existence with no symbol or intermediary.

Controversies

True Brahmos False Brahmos

 Brahmoism is the highest form of Hinduism, and is so very different from what passes for Hinduism today that Brahmos consider themselves to be "beyond the pale of Hinduism" and a separate religion altogether. 
 A "True" Brahmo is either an adherent of Brahmoism to the exclusion of all other religions, or a person with at least one Brahmo parent or guardian and who has never denied his faith. 
 "False" Brahmos are those who believe that "following" the principles of Brahmoism is sufficient. These people have given Brahmoism a very bad reputation. Prominent examples of such "False" Brahmos are Keshub Chunder Sen and Nabobidhan "New Dispensation" who have preached and propagated Rosicrucianism and other Masonic beliefs in the guise of Brahmoism. Even today they operate secret societies to attract neophytes to their symbolic devil worship in the name of Brahmoism.

Caste
The Secretary of the organisation circulated the current Brahmo position on caste in a series of messages.

Casteism is allowed in Brahmoism
<blockquote>"The Trust principles refer to "all sorts and descriptions of people without distinction" This is not a prohibition against caste. It admits that people are of all sorts and description. It denies "distinction" among them. In other words people can be "sorted" into caste but the people within the "caste" cannot have distinctions. This Brahmic concept has even been incorporated into India's Constitution as a fundamental right.
"Every person is equal, but if people can be reasonably classified then some classes can be more equal than others."

Brahmoism only for Brahmins
In another message the Secretary of the organisation clarifies that Brahmoism is only for Brahmins.
"Brahmoism then (as it is today) was a Religion for Brahmons of Brahmons by Brahmons."

References 

Brahmoism
Organisations based in Uttar Pradesh
Religious organisations based in India
Hindu organisations based in India
1881 establishments in British India
Religious organizations established in 1881